Monument to the Revolution of the people of Moslavina  or simply Monument to the Revolution is a World War II memorial sculpture by Dušan Džamonja, located in Podgarić, Berek municipality, Croatia. The monument is about 10m tall and 20m wide. It is dedicated to the people of Moslavina during World War II.

See also

List of Yugoslav World War II monuments and memorials

External links 

 Photographs of the sculpture (artificialowl.net)
 Spomenik Database - Podgarić historic & informational resource
 Featured in a series of music videos by Alan Walker

Buildings and structures completed in 1967
World War II memorials in Croatia
1967 sculptures
Yugoslav World War II monuments and memorials
Bjelovar-Bilogora County